Tendla (also Tinedla or Tenedla) is a town and commune in Djamaa District, El Oued Province, Algeria. According to the 2008 census it has a population of 9,193, up from 8,033 in 1998, with an annual growth rate of 1.4%, the second-lowest in the province.

Climate

Tendla has a hot desert climate (Köppen climate classification BWh), with very hot summers and mild winters. Rainfall is light and sporadic, and summers are particularly dry.

Transportation

Tendla is at the eastern end of the regional road W303, which connects it to the N3  to the west. From there the N3 leads north to Biskra and south to Touggourt.

Education

Among the residents, 3.4% of the population has a tertiary education, and another 13.6% has completed secondary education. The overall literacy rate is 73.8%, and is 81.5% among males and 66.2% among females.

Localities
The commune of Tendla is composed of two localities:
Tendla
Arfiane El Bared

References

Neighbouring towns and cities

Communes of El Oued Province